Samuel Constantine Maragos (August 19, 1922 – August 23, 2005) was an American politician from Illinois who served as a Democratic member of the Illinois General Assembly from 1969 to 1980.

Biography
Maragos was born in Sioux City, Iowa on August 19, 1922. His family moved to Chicago where he was educated at Phil Sheridan Elementary and Bowen High School. During World War II, Maragos served in the United States Army, eventually being discharged as a second lieutenant. He graduated from the University of Chicago in 1943 with a Bachelor of Arts and from John Marshall Law School in 1948 with a Juris Doctor. Maragos was active in the Greek American community as National President of the Pan Arcadian Federation of America and in the leadership of the Hellenic Democratic Club of Illinois. He and his wife Cleo Mavrick had four children.

Maragos was sworn into the Illinois House of Representatives in 1969 where he served until his appointment to the Illinois Senate on November 1, 1976. Maragos resigned from the Illinois Senate on December 3, 1980. He was succeeded by Glenn Dawson. He served as a judge for the Cook County Circuit Court from 1992 until his retirement in 1995. He died on August 23, 2005.

References

1922 births
2005 deaths
Politicians from Sioux City, Iowa
20th-century American politicians
Democratic Party members of the Illinois House of Representatives
Lawyers from Chicago
Politicians from Chicago
Military personnel from Illinois
Democratic Party Illinois state senators
American people of Greek descent
University of Chicago alumni
John Marshall Law School (Chicago) alumni
Illinois state court judges
20th-century American judges
20th-century American lawyers
People from Sioux City, Iowa
American lawyers
United States Army personnel of World War II